Schrankia taenialis, the white-line snout, is a species of moth of the  family Erebidae. It is found from Central Europe to Sardinia, Sicily, North Turkey and Azerbaijan.

Technical description and variation

H. taenialis Hbn. (= albistrigatis Haw., albistrigatus Stph., acuminalis H.-Sch., albistrigalis Guen.) Forewing brownish ; a fine black dash beneath costa at base; inner line dentate, blackish ; outer black, outwardly whitish-edged, indistinct towards costa, straight and conspicuous in lower half; cellspot dark, obscure, paler posteriorly ; subterminal line pale, indistinct ; hindwing light grey. The wingspan is 18–24 mm.

Biology
Adults are on wing in summer. There are two generations per year.

The larvae feed on Melampyrum, Calluna and Thymus species

References

External links

White-line snout on UKmoths
Fauna Europaea
Lepiforum.de
Vlindernet.nl 

Moths of Europe
Moths of Asia
Moths of the Middle East
Hypenodinae
Taxa named by Jacob Hübner
Moths described in 1809